The Sheriff's Oath is a 1920 American short silent Western film directed by Phil Rosen and featuring Hoot Gibson. The film was produced and distributed by Universal Pictures.

Cast
 Hoot Gibson
 Arthur Mackley
 Martha Mattox
 Josephine Hill
 James O'Neill credited as Jim O'Neal
 J. Herbert Frank credited as Bert Frank

See also
 Hoot Gibson filmography

References

External links
 

1920 films
1920 Western (genre) films
1920 short films
American silent short films
American black-and-white films
Films directed by Phil Rosen
Silent American Western (genre) films
Universal Pictures short films
1920s American films